The 1956 season was the forty-fifth season for Santos FC.

References

External links
Official Site 

Santos
1956
1956 in Brazilian football